"Hagnagora" vittata is a species of moth of the family Geometridae first described by Philippi in 1859. It is found in Chile.

Larvae have been reported feeding on Fuchsia magellanica.

Taxonomy
The species was provisionally removed from the genus Hagnagora. The wing pattern and particularly the wing shape diverge strongly from species in this genus.

References

Moths described in 1859
Larentiinae
Endemic fauna of Chile